John Allen Hussey  (17 April 1897 – 18 August 1969) was an English first-class cricketer and Royal Navy officer.

Hussey served in the First World War with the Royal Navy as an acting paymaster sub-lieutenant, for which he was commended in the London Gazette. He was confirmed in the rank of paymaster sub-lieutenant in January 1919, with promotion to the rank of paymaster lieutenant following in July 1919. He was promoted to paymaster lieutenant commander in July 1927. Hussey made a single appearance in first-class cricket for the Royal Navy against the Royal Air Force at Chatham in 1929. Batting once in the match, Hussey top scored in the Royal Navy first-innings with 54, before being dismissed by Reginald Fulljames. He was promoted to paymaster commander in June 1935.

Hussey served in the Second World War, during which he was appointed an OBE. In the year following the war, he was promoted to paymaster captain. He was appointed as a naval aide-de-camp to George VI in November 1951, later briefly serving Elizabeth II in the same role. He retired from active service in April 1952. Hussey died in August 1969 at Raynes Park, Surrey. His brother-in-law, Derrick Hall, also played first-class cricket, with Hussey having married his sister, Elizabeth, in May 1934.

References

External links

1897 births
1969 deaths
People from Axbridge
Royal Navy officers of World War I
English cricketers
Royal Navy cricketers
Members of the Order of the British Empire
Royal Navy officers of World War II
Royal Navy logistics officers